The 1908 Saskatchewan general election was held on August 14, 1908 to elect members of the Legislative Assembly of Saskatchewan. Premier Walter Scott and his Liberal Party were re-elected for a second term, defeating the Provincial Rights Party of Frederick W. A. G. Haultain.

Note:
William Turgeon ran in two ridings, in Duck Lake he won and in Prince Albert City where he lost.

Members of the Legislative Assembly elected
For complete electoral history, see individual districts

See also
List of Saskatchewan political parties

References
Saskatchewan Archives Board – Election Results By Electoral Division
Elections Saskatchewan - Provincial Vote Summaries

Further reading
 

1908 elections in Canada
1908 in Saskatchewan
1908
August 1908 events